Hibbertia cistifolia is a species of flowering plant in the family Dilleniaceae and is endemic to northern Australia. It is a prostrate to low-lying sub-shrub with trailing, wiry stems, hairy foliage, oblong to elliptic leaves and yellow flowers arranged in leaf axils, with forty to fifty-eight stamens arranged around the two carpels.

Description
There are forty to fifty-eight stamens arranged around the two carpels, each carpel with two ovules. Flowering occurs from December to June.

Taxonomy
Hibbertia cistifolia was first formally described in 1817 by Augustin Pyramus de Candolle in his Regni Vegetabilis Systema Naturale from an unpublished description by Robert Brown.

Distribution and habitat
This hibbertia grows in woodland on sandy flats and gravelly slopes in the north of the Northern Territory and on Cape York Peninsula in Queensland.

Conservation status
Goodenia cistifolia is classified as of "least concern" under the Northern Territory Government Territory Parks and Wildlife Conservation Act 1976 and the Queensland Government Nature Conservation Act 1992.

See also
List of Hibbertia species

References

cistifolia
Flora of the Northern Territory
Flora of Queensland
Plants described in 1817
Taxa named by Augustin Pyramus de Candolle